Ramabai (रमाबाई) may refer to:

People
 Ramabai Peshwa (1750–1772), wife of Madhavrao Peshwa I
 Pandita Ramabai (1858–1922), reformer for women's rights and education
 Ramabai Bhimrao Ambedkar (1897–1935), wife of B. R. Ambedkar

Films
 Ramabai (film) (2016) about Ramabai Bhimrao Ambedkar
 Ramabai Bhimrao Ambedkar (film) (2011)